Duvefjorden is a fjord at the northern side of Nordaustlandet, Svalbard. Former names of the fjord include Baye du Pigeon, Dove Bay, Tauben Bai and Duiven-baai.

References

Fjords of Svalbard
Nordaustlandet